Khulo is a district of Georgia, in the autonomous republic of Adjara. Its main town is Khulo.

Population: 35,520

Area: 710 km2

Politics
Khulo Municipal Assembly (Georgian: ხულოს საკრებულო, Khulo Sakrebulo) is a representative body in Khulo Municipality, consisting of 24 members which is elected every four years. The last election was held in October 2021. Vakhtang Beridze of Georgian Dream was elected mayor.

Administrative divisions

Khulo Municipality is divided into 1 borough (დაბა, daba), 12 communities (თემი, temi), and 78 villages (სოფელი, sopeli):

Boroughs 
 Khulo

Communities 

 Agara
 Dek'anashvilebi
 Didach'ara
 Diok'nisi
 Vashlovani
 Tkhilvana
 Riq'eti
 Satsikhuri
 Skhalti
 Pushruk'auli
 Ghorjomi
 Khikhadziri

Villages 

 Agara
 Dek'anashvilebi
 Ganakhleba
 Godgadzeebi
 Gudasakho
 Diak'onidzeebi
 Duadzeebi
 K'urtskhali
 Okruashvilebi
 Uchkho
 Kedlebi
 Dzirk'vadzeebi
 Elelidzeebi
 Didach'ara
 Boghauri
 Iremadzeebi
 Diok'nisi
 Beghleti
 Geladzeebi
 Iakobadzeebi
 Kort'okhi
 Maniaketi
 P'aksadze
 T'abakhmela
 Ghorjomeladzeebi
 Ghurt'a
 Jvariketi
 Kveda Vashlovani
 Zeda Vashlovani
 Tago
 Skhandara
 Shurmuli
 Chao
 Zeda Tkhilvana
 Bako
 Mtisubani
 Kvemo Tkhilvana
 Riq'eti
 Bodzauri
 Danisparauli
 Shuasopeli
 Satsikhuri
 Gelaura
 Namonast'revi
 Pant'nari
 Q'inchauri
 Gurdzauli
 K'vat'ia
 Pachkha
 Q'ishla
 Dzmagula
 Ts'ablana
 Ch'eri
 Pushruk'auli
 Vernebi
 Makhalakauri
 Oshanakhevi
 Rakvta
 Ghorjomi
 Adadzeebi
 Akhaliubani
 Gorgadzeebi
 Vanadzeebi
 Vashaq'madzeebi
 Labaidzeebi
 Mek'eidzeebi
 Merchkheti
 Mekhalashvilebi
 Mintadzeebi
 St'epanashvilebi
 Tunadzeebi
 Kurduli
 Ts'ints'k'alashvilebi
 Ch'akhauri
 Khikhadziri
 Akhalsheni
 K'alota
 Sk'vana

See also 
 List of municipalities in Georgia (country)

External links 
 Official website of Khulo District
 Districts of Georgia, Statoids.com

References

Municipalities of Adjara